Aztalan can refer to related places in Wisconsin in the United States:
 Aztalan, Wisconsin, a town
 Aztalan, Wisconsin (community), within the above town
 Aztalan State Park

See also
Aztlán (disambiguation)